St Andrew House (now styled as the Premier Inn Glasgow Buchanan Galleries) is a mid-rise skyscraper in the centre of Glasgow, Scotland.   

It has been a prominent landmark on the eastern end of the city's Sauchiehall Street since the mid-1960s when it was completed, and was one of the first post-war high rise buildings in the city centre. It stands on the former site of the Lyric Theatre (which was destroyed by fire in 1953 and demolished in 1959) on the corner of West Nile Street and Sauchiehall Street.  

The building consists of a 15-storey office tower, which sits atop a 2-storey podium incorporating a row of shops and retail units.  Since 2001, it has been flanked by the 11-storey Cineworld cinema built on an adjacent site on Renfrew Street.  It should not be confused with nearby St Andrew's House – the headquarters building of the St. Andrew's Ambulance Association in Cowcaddens.

History

For much of its existence the building has been used as offices, but since the development of newer 'Grade A' office space in the city's new financial district, its owners struggled to find tenants, the building was sold in 2010 for conversion into a hotel – the long leases on the street level shop units preventing demolition.

Current use

In 2010 it was announced that the hotel chain Premier Inn had acquired the tower and planned to convert it into a 210-bedroom hotel, in a similar manner to Elmbank Gardens in nearby Charing Cross – another example of a concrete high-rise office building to be so converted.  Owing to the fact that the central area of Glasgow is built on an extremely steep drumlin, on which St. Andrew House is built near the summit, the curiosity arises that the rooms on the 18th floor of the building, are in fact the highest hotel rooms in Glasgow, higher than the luxury suites on the 20th Floor of the Glasgow Hilton in Anderston.

Renovations

In 2011, the building was stripped of its original curtain wall made from concrete aggregate panels and replaced by a modern structure. The hotel opened in October 2012.

See also
 List of tallest buildings and structures in Glasgow

References

Skyscrapers in Glasgow
Skyscraper hotels in the United Kingdom
1964 establishments in Scotland
Hotels in Glasgow
Hotels established in 2012